Arthur Wellesley Peel, 1st Viscount Peel,  (3 August 182924 October 1912), was a British Liberal politician, who sat in the House of Commons from 1865 to 1895. He was Speaker of the House of Commons from 1884 until 1895, when he was raised to the peerage.

Early life
Peel was the fifth and youngest son of the Conservative Prime Minister Sir Robert Peel by his wife, Julia, the daughter of General Sir John Floyd, 1st Baronet. Peel was named after Arthur Wellesley, Duke of Wellington, and was educated at Eton and Balliol College, Oxford.

Political career
Peel was elected Liberal Member of Parliament (MP) for Warwick in the 1865 general election and held the seat until 1885, when it was replaced under the Redistribution of Seats Act 1885. From 1868 to 1871, he was Parliamentary Secretary to the Poor Law Board and then became Parliamentary Secretary to the Board of Trade. In 1873 to 1874, he was patronage secretary to the Treasury, and in 1880, he became Under-Secretary of State for Home Affairs in William Ewart Gladstone's second government. On the retirement of Sir Henry Brand, Peel was elected Speaker of the House of Commons on 26 February 1884.

In the 1885 general election, Peel was elected for Warwick and Leamington. Throughout his career as Speaker, as the Encyclopædia Britannica Eleventh Edition noted, "he exhibited conspicuous impartiality, combined with a perfect knowledge of the traditions, usages and forms of the House, soundness of judgment, and readiness of decision upon all occasions". Though officially impartial, Peel left the Liberal Party over the issue of Home Rule and became a Liberal Unionist. Peel was also an important ally of Charles Bradlaugh, whose campaigns to have the oath of allegiance changed eventally permitted non-Christians, such as agnostics and atheists, to serve in the House of Commons.

Peel retired for health reasons at the 1895 general election and was created Viscount Peel, of Sandy in the County of Bedford, with a pension of £4,000 for life. He was presented with the Freedom of the City of London in July of that year. In 1896, he was chairman of a Royal Commission into the licensing laws. Other members of the Commission disagreed with part of his report, and he resigned the chair, which left Sir Algernon West to complete a majority report. However, the report was published in Peel's name and recommended that the number of licensed houses should be greatly reduced. The report was a valuable weapon in the hands of reformers.

A street in Warwick, Peel Road, was named in his honour.

Family
Peel married Adelaide Dugdale (14 November 1839 – 5 December 1890), daughter of William Stratford Dugdale, in 1862. She died in December 1890 and Lord Peel remained a widower until his death in October 1912, aged 83. They had seven children:   
 Julia Beatrice Peel (1864–1949) married the Irish Parliamentary Party MP James Rochfort Maguire
 William [Wellesley] Peel (1867–1937) succeeded as 2nd Viscount; created Earl Peel in 1929
 [Arthur] George [Villiers] Peel (1868–1956) politician and author
 Sidney [Cornwallis] Peel (1870–1938) a colonel and for four years an MP, created a baronet in 1936
 Agnes [Mary] Peel (1869x71–1959) married the Conservative MP Sydney Goldman.
 Ella [Frances] Peel  (1872–1900)
 Maurice Berkeley Peel (1873–1917) Church of England vicar, later a military chaplain killed in action in the First World War.

References

External links

 
Inspector Denning & Arthur Peel - Victorian Parliament - UK Parliament Living Heritage
 The Rowers of Vanity Fair - Peel, Arthur Wellesley (Viscount Peel) - "The Speaker"

1829 births
1912 deaths
Children of prime ministers of the United Kingdom
Alumni of Balliol College, Oxford
Members of the Privy Council of the United Kingdom
People educated at Eton College
Liberal Party (UK) MPs for English constituencies
Speakers of the House of Commons of the United Kingdom
Viscounts Peel
UK MPs 1865–1868
UK MPs 1868–1874
UK MPs 1874–1880
UK MPs 1880–1885
UK MPs 1885–1886
UK MPs 1886–1892
UK MPs 1892–1895
UK MPs who were granted peerages
Younger sons of baronets
Arthur
Parliamentary Secretaries to the Board of Trade
Liberal Unionist Party MPs for English constituencies
Peers of the United Kingdom created by Queen Victoria